Mike Powers (born September 24, 1950) is an American former professional tennis player.

Powers, a native of Glen Cove, New York, played on the hockey and tennis teams at Brown University. He was an All-Ivy first-team selection for singles in 1973 and on the professional tour had a best world ranking of 210. At the 1974 Volvo International in Bretton Woods he saved a match point to defeat Wimbledon junior finalist Ashok Amritraj in the first round, before falling in his next match to Rod Laver.

References

External links
 
 
 Mike Powers at College Hockey News

1950 births
Living people
American male tennis players
Tennis people from New York (state)
Brown Bears men's tennis players
Brown Bears men's ice hockey players
American ice hockey right wingers
Sportspeople from Glen Cove, New York